The 2022 Winston-Salem Open was a men's tennis tournament play on outdoor hard courts. It was the 53rd edition of the Winston-Salem Open (as successor to previous tournaments in New Haven and Long Island), and part of the ATP Tour 250 Series of the 2022 ATP Tour. It took place at Wake Forest University in Winston-Salem, North Carolina, United States, from August 21 through August 27, 2022. It was the last event on the 2022 US Open Series before the 2022 US Open.

Champions

Singles 

  Adrian Mannarino def.  Laslo Đere, 7–6(7–1), 6–4

Doubles 

  Matthew Ebden /  Jamie Murray def.  Hugo Nys /  Jan Zieliński, 6–4, 6–2

Points & prize money

Point distribution

Prize money 

*per team

Singles main draw entrants

Seeds 

† Rankings are as of 15 August 2022.

Other entrants 
The following players received wildcard entry into the singles main draw:
  Grigor Dimitrov
  Dominic Thiem
  J.J. Wolf
  Mikael Ymer

The following players received entry using a protected ranking:
  Kyle Edmund

The following players received entry from the qualifying draw: 
  Marc-Andrea Hüsler
  Jason Kubler
  Emilio Nava
  Christopher O'Connell

The following players received entry as lucky losers:
  Taro Daniel
  Márton Fucsovics 
  Tallon Griekspoor 
  Shintaro Mochizuki
  Michail Pervolarakis

Withdrawals 
 Before the tournament
  Sebastián Báez → replaced by  Márton Fucsovics
  Alexander Bublik → replaced by  Adrian Mannarino
  Pablo Carreño Busta → replaced by  Taro Daniel
  Hugo Dellien → replaced by  Shintaro Mochizuki
  Tomás Martín Etcheverry → replaced by  Michail Pervolarakis
  Marcos Giron → replaced by  Peter Gojowczyk
  Quentin Halys → replaced by  Denis Kudla
  Alex Molčan → replaced by  John Millman
  Brandon Nakashima → replaced by  Jack Draper
  Oscar Otte → replaced by  Richard Gasquet
  Tommy Paul → replaced by  Dušan Lajović
  Holger Rune → replaced by  Tallon Griekspoor
  Frances Tiafoe → replaced by  Steve Johnson

Doubles main draw entrants

Seeds 

† Rankings are as of 15 August 2022.

Other entrants 
The following pairs received wildcard entry into the doubles main draw :
  Robert Galloway /  Alex Lawson
  Skander Mansouri /  Matthew Thomson

Withdrawals 
  Marcelo Arévalo /  Jean-Julien Rojer → replaced by  Hugo Nys /  Jan Zieliński
  Matthew Ebden /  Max Purcell → replaced by  Matthew Ebden /  Jamie Murray
  Santiago González /  Andrés Molteni → replaced by  Aleksandr Nedovyesov /  Aisam-ul-Haq Qureshi
  Wesley Koolhof /  Neal Skupski → replaced by  Fabrice Martin /  Jonny O'Mara
  Kevin Krawietz /  Andreas Mies → replaced by  Sander Gillé /  Joran Vliegen
  Jamie Murray /  Bruno Soares → replaced by  Nathaniel Lammons /  Jackson Withrow

References

External links 
 

2022 ATP Tour
2022
2022 in American tennis
2022 in sports in North Carolina
August 2022 sports events in the United States